In the field of software engineering, a profile diagram operates at the metamodel level to show stereotypes as classes with the «stereotype» stereotype, and profiles as packages with the «profile» stereotype. The extension relation (solid line with closed, filled arrowhead) indicates what metamodel element a given stereotype is extending.

History
The profile diagram didn't exist in UML 1. It was introduced with UML 2 to display the usage of profiles. Before its introduction, other diagrams had been used to display this issue.

See also
 UML diagrams

References

 Christoph Kecher: "UML 2.0 - Das umfassende Handbuch" Galileo Computing, 2006, 

Unified Modeling Language diagrams
Systems Modeling Language